Lake Winona or Winona Lake may refer to:

 Lake Winona (Arkansas), a lake of Saline County, Arkansas
 Lake Winona Research Natural Area, a National Natural Landmark in Arkansas
 Lake Winona, a lake in the Clermont chain of lakes, Florida
 Winona Lake, Indiana, a town and the lake that it is situated on
 Winona Lake (Flathead County, Montana), a lake
 Lake Winona (Minnesota), in Winona, Minnesota
 Lake Winona, a New Hampton, New Hampshire
 Lake Winona (Vermont), a Vermont lake

See also
Winona (disambiguation)